Sounds from the Thievery Hi-Fi is the debut studio album by American electronic music duo Thievery Corporation. It was first released in 1996 in Germany and on June 7, 1997 by ESL Music in the United States. Guest vocals include Pam Bricker and Bebel Gilberto. As of 2002, the album has sold over 33,000 copies in US according to Nielsen SoundScan.

Track listing

Original release
This version was released in 1996 by ESL Music in Germany. It was later released by 4AD in the United Kingdom  and by Rough Trade Germany in Germany and in 2002 by Labels in France.

"A Warning (Dub)" – 2:21
"2001 Spliff Odyssey" – 7:45
"Shaolin Satellite" – 6:26
"Vivid" - 4:22
"Universal Highness" – 4:25
"Incident at Gate 7" – 6:27
"Scene at the Open Air Market" – 2:36
"The Glass Bead Game" – 6:15
"The Foundation" – 5:39
"Interlude" – 2:26
"The Oscillator" – 4:14
"So Vast as the Sky" - 5:02
".38.45 (A Thievery Number)" – 5:11
"Walking Through Babylon" – 4:27

US release
This was released by Eighteenth Street Lounge Music on June 7, 1997.

"A Warning (Dub)" – 2:14
"2001 Spliff Odyssey" – 5:06
"Shaolin Satellite" – 6:23
"Transcendence" – 4:06
"Universal Highness" – 4:21
"Incident at Gate 7" – 6:28
"Manha" – 3:48
"Scene at the Open Air Market" – 2:57
"The Glass Bead Game" – 6:11
"Encounter in Bahia" – 3:59
"The Foundation" – 5:38
"Interlude" – 2:22
"The Oscillator" – 4:14
"Assault on Babylon" – 4:25
".38.45 (A Thievery Number)" – 5:06
"One" – 4:51

2006 re-release
Eighteenth Street Lounge Music rereleased the album in early 2006 with the following track listing.

"A Warning (Dub)" – 2:14
"2001 Spliff Odyssey" – 5:06
"Shaolin Satellite" – 6:23
"Transcendence" – 4:06
"Universal Highness" – 4:21
"Incident at Gate 7" – 6:28
"Scene at the Open Air Market" – 2:57
"The Glass Bead Game" – 6:11
"Encounter in Bahia" – 3:59
"The Foundation" – 5:38
"Interlude" – 2:22
"The Oscillator" – 4:14
"Assault on Babylon" – 4:25
".38.45 (A Thievery Number)" – 5:06
"One" – 4:51
"Sun, Moon & Stars" – 4:30
"The Sleeper Car" – 3:07

Notes
 "Incident at Gate 7" contains a sample from Kool and the Gang's "Summer Madness".
 "The Glass Bead Game" contains a sample from Cal Tjader's "Samba Do Suenho".
 The album is dedicated to the memory of Antonio Carlos Jobim.

Charts

References

1996 debut albums
Thievery Corporation albums